Electoral history of Nelson Rockefeller, who served as the 41st vice president of the United States (1974–1977), the 49th governor of New York (1959–1973), and was a three-time candidate for the Republican Party presidential nomination (1960; 1964; 1968).

Gubernatorial elections

1966

1970

Presidential nomination elections

1960

1964

1968

1974 vice presidential confirmation

References

Rockefeller, Nelson
Nelson A. Rockefeller